Cipanas may refer to:

 Cipanas, Cianjur, a town and district in Cianjur Regency
 Cipanas, Cipanas, Cianjur, a village in Cianjur Regency
 Cipanas Palace, a presidential palace of the Republic of Indonesia
 Cipanas, Lebak, a town and district in Lebak Regency
 Cipanas, Cipanas, Lebak, a village in Lebak Regency
 Cipanas, Cipatujah, Tasikmalaya, a village in Tasikmalaya Regency
 Cipanas, Dukupuntang, Cirebon, a village in Cirebon Regency
 Cipanas, Tanjungkerta, Sumedang, a village in Sumedang Regency